Perry Township is one of the five townships of Lake County, Ohio, United States. As of the 2010 census the population was 8,999.

Geography
Located in the northeastern part of the county along Lake Erie, it borders the following townships:
Madison Township - east
LeRoy Township - south
Concord Township - southwest corner
Painesville Township - west

Two villages are located in Perry Township: Perry in the center, and most of North Perry in the northeast along the lakeshore.

The township boundaries extend north to the center of Lake Erie and the Canadian border.

Name and history
It is one of 26 Perry Townships statewide.

Government
The township is governed by a three-member board of trustees, who are elected in November of odd-numbered years to a four-year term beginning on the following January 1. Two are elected in the year after the presidential election and one is elected in the year before it. There is also an elected township fiscal officer, who serves a four-year term beginning on April 1 of the year after the election, which is held in November of the year before the presidential election. Vacancies in the fiscal officership or on the board of trustees are filled by the remaining trustees. As of 2014, the trustees are Rick Amos, Robert Dawson, and Nancy Steele, and the fiscal officer is Christine Page.

See also
 Interstate 90 Grand River bridges

References

External links

Lake County website

Townships in Lake County, Ohio
Townships in Ohio